Nemanja Radonjić (born 15 February 1996) is a Serbian professional footballer who plays as a winger for Serie A club Torino, on loan from Ligue 1 club Marseille. He has also represented the Serbia national team since 2017.

Club career

Early years
Romani origin. He is born in Niš. Radonjić played in youth academy of the local club Radnički in his early years. Previously, he was a member of the local clubs Medijana and Železničar where he made his first football steps. As one of the best prospects in the academy, Radonjić moved to Partizan where he spent several, but later declared himself as a fan of the greatest opponent, Red Star Belgrade. Next he spent several months with Gheorghe Hagi Football Academy in Romania, before he signed a five-year contract with Roma in 2014, being loaned to Empoli for a season. At the beginning of 2016, Radonjić returned to Serbia, and joined Čukarički as a loaned player. He scored a goal on his debut for Čukarički in the Serbian SuperLiga. In the next fixture match, against Jagodina, he scored a goal from around 30 meters long distance of a goal, and later made assist for another goal. Playing with Čukarički, Radonjić collected 31 appearances with 4 goals in all competitions until the end of 2016–17 season.

Red Star Belgrade

On 21 July 2017, Radonjić moved to Red Star Belgrade. He signed a five-year deal with his new club, being formally loaned until summer 2019, when his contract with Roma will end. He chose to wear the number 49 jersey at his new club. Radonjić made his debut for Red Star Belgrade in the first leg of the third qualifying round for 2017–18 UEFA Europa League, replacing Ricardo Cavalcante Mendes in the 61st minute of the match against Sparta Prague, played on 27 July 2017. Radonjić scored his first goal for the club in the second leg of the play-off round for UEFA Europa League, in 2–1 victory against Krasnodar. Radonjić played his first eternal derby on 27 August 2017, replacing Aleksandar Pešić in the 67th minute of the match. Radonjić scored his second goal for Red Star in 1–1 draw to BATE Borisov on 14 September 2017. Radonjić suffered a metatarsal bone fracture during the match against Rad on 18 November 2017. He became the third player in squad who injured in the same way since the beginning of the 2017–18 campaign, after Branko Jovičić and Vanja Vučićević. Returning to the field, Radonjić scored his first domestic league goal for Red Star Belgrade in the eternal derby match, played on 14 April 2018. Later, Radonjić scored four goals in five played matches until the end of season, including the last fixture match against Voždovac, when he won the first trophy in the professional career. In May 2018, Radonjić was elected in the best 11 players for the 2017–18 Serbian SuperLiga season, by clubs captains' and managers' choice. On 25 July 2018, Radonjić scored a twice in the first leg of second qualifying round for the 2018–19 UEFA Champions League campaign, after which he was also named as a player of the match in 3–0 victory over Sūduva. Scoring in extra time of the match against Spartak Trnava on 14 August 2018, Radonjić secured the group stage of the 2018–19 UEFA Europa League campaign and play-off qualifying round for the Champions League, against Red Bull Salzburg. On 29 August 2018, Red Star purchased the deal from Roma, keeping Radonjić until June 2021.

Marseille
On 30 August 2018, Radonjić signed with French side Olympique de Marseille after helping qualify Red Star Belgrade for the group stage of the Champions League. He was assigned the number 7 jersey in his new club. The transfer fee was reported as €12 million plus 2 million in bonuses. Radonjić made his debut for the club in 4–0 Ligue 1 home victory over Guingamp on 16 September 2018, replacing Dimitri Payet in the 84th minute.

Loan to Hertha BSC
On 1 February 2021, Radonjić joined German side Hertha BSC on loan for the remainder of the 2020–21 season. While at Hertha BSC, Radonjić appeared in 12 games overall, scoring his first goal and getting his first assist in the same game against Freiburg. He played his last game for Hertha against TSG Hoffenheim before returning to France. 

Loan to Benfica

He joined Benfica for the 2021-22 season on loan, he appeared in overall 11 games scoring one goal before returning back to France and being loaned out again, this time to Turin based club, Torino in Italy.

Loan to Torino 
On 7 July 2022, Radonjić joined Serie A club Torino on loan from Marseille for the 2022–23 season. The deal includes an option to make the move permanent for Torino.

International career

As a member of Serbian under-17 level, Radonjić scored 5 goals on 6 matches between 2012 and 2013, including a hat-trick in a match Belarus. Later, he had also been a member of the under-18 and under-19 national teams. Radonjić was called into the Serbia U20 national squad in November 2016 by coach Nenad Lalatović, when made his debut for the team in a match against Montenegro. As a coach of Serbia U21 selection, Nenad Lalatović also invited him to the squad for the 2017 UEFA European Under-21 Championship. In November 2017, Radonjić was invited to Serbia national football team for an Asia tour by caretaker Mladen Krstajić. He made his debut for Serbia in a friendly draw to South Korea on 14 November 2017, replacing Andrija Živković in 81 minute of the match.

In June 2018, Serbia manager Mladen Krstajić included Radonjić in the final 23-man squad for the 2018 FIFA World Cup. There he appeared on two matches, against Switzerland and Brazil.   Serbia was knocked out in the group stage, having only won against Costa Rica. 

In November 2022, he was selected in Serbia's squad for the 2022 FIFA World Cup held in Qatar. He played in all three group stage matches, against Brazil, losing 2-0 Cameroon, drawing 3-3 and Switzerland losing 3-2. Serbia finished fourth in the group.

Career statistics

Club

1Includes Serbian Cup, Coupe de France and Taça de Portugal.
2Includes Coupe de la Ligue and Taça da Liga.
3Includes UEFA Champions League and UEFA Europa League.
4Includes Trophée des Champions.

International

Scores and results list Serbia's goal tally first.

Honours

Club
Red Star Belgrade
Serbian SuperLiga: 2017–18

Individual
Serbian SuperLiga Team of the Season: 2017–18

References

External links

1996 births
Living people
Sportspeople from Niš
Association football wingers
Serbian footballers
Serbia international footballers
Serbia under-21 international footballers
Serbia youth international footballers
Serbian SuperLiga players
Ligue 1 players
Primeira Liga players
Serie A players
A.S. Roma players
FK Čukarički players
Red Star Belgrade footballers
Olympique de Marseille players
S.L. Benfica footballers
Torino F.C. players
Serbian expatriate footballers
Serbian expatriate sportspeople in Italy
Serbian expatriate sportspeople in France
Serbian expatriate sportspeople in Portugal
Expatriate footballers in Italy
Expatriate footballers in France
Expatriate footballers in Portugal
2018 FIFA World Cup players
2022 FIFA World Cup players